Going to Extremes is a non-fiction book by Joe McGinniss. It was first published in 1980. The book is about McGinniss' travels through Alaska for a year. The book became a bestseller.

The Los Angeles Times called it a "vivid memoir."

McGinniss returned to the subject of Alaska in 2009 to write a biography about former Alaska governor Sarah Palin, The Rogue: Searching for the Real Sarah Palin.

See also
 Coming into the Country, a book by John McPhee which covers much of the same subject matter and time frame

References

1980 non-fiction books
American travel books
Books about Alaska